Doug Sheldon (born Bernard Bobrow, 22 June 1936) is an English former pop singer, actor, and novelist.

Early life 
Sheldon was born into a family of carnival businesspeople, and he worked as a barker while receiving training in acting.

Career 
After completing military service, he landed a role in the 1961 film The Guns of Navarone, and worked in small theatre productions. He shared a flat in London with three other then-unknown actors, including Michael Caine and Sean Connery. Sheldon was discovered by Bunny Lewis while performing on-stage and was quickly offered a recording contract with Decca Records, even though he had no previous experience performing as a singer.

Sheldon's first single was "Book of Love", which did not chart. The follow-up single was a cover of the song "Runaround Sue", which became a hit record in the UK Singles Chart reaching #36, although Dion's version soon overshadowed it in popularity. His next single, "Your Ma Said You Cried in Your Sleep Last Night", became his highest-charting hit in the UK at No. 29. Shel Talmy produced the next single, "Lollipops and Roses", which flopped, but with the song "I Saw Linda Yesterday" he managed to crack the UK Singles Chart for the last time in 1963 at #36, thus emulating his first hit's position.

After the middle of the decade, Sheldon returned to a career in acting, where he appeared on TV in Doctor Who, The Avengers and Triangle, and in films such as The Yellow Teddy Bears (1963), the musical comedy Just for You (1964), Some Girls Do (1969), The Spy Killer (1969), Ryan's Daughter (1970), Soft Beds, Hard Battles (1974), Appointment with Death (1988) and Iron Eagle II (1988). He also published novels using the slightly fuller name of Douglas Sheldon. In 2007, his entire Decca discography was released on CD by Vocalion Records.

Singles
"Book of Love" (1961)
"Runaround Sue" (1961) UK No. 36
"Your Ma Said You Cried in Your Sleep Last Night" (1962) UK No. 29
"Lollipops and Roses" (1963)
"I Saw Linda Yesterday" (1963) UK No. 36
"Mickey's Monkey" (1964)
"Let's Make A Habit Of This" (1964) Decca DL 25 111 (Teldec)

Filmography

Film

Television

References

External links
Douglas Sheldon at Theatricalia

1936 births
Living people
English pop singers
English male singers
English male television actors
People from Stepney
English male film actors